Lester Rawlins (September 24, 1924March 22, 1988) was an American stage, screen, and television actor. He graduated from the Carnegie Mellon College of Drama in 1950 with a BFA.

Born in Sharon, Pennsylvania, Rawlins appeared in off-Broadway productions of Hamlet, Macbeth, Romeo and Juliet, Richard III, Winterset, In the Bar of a Tokyo Hotel, and Nightride, for which he won the Drama Desk Award for Outstanding Performance.

His Broadway credits included A Man for All Seasons and Da, for which he won the Tony Award for Best Performance by a Featured Actor in a Play and was nominated for the Drama Desk Award for Outstanding Featured Actor in a Play. Rawlins also won Obie Awards for his performance in the 1964 off-Broadway production of the play The Old Glory by the poet Robert Lowell and for his performances in off-Broadway productions of Brendan Behan's The Quare Fellow and Henrik Ibsen's Hedda Gabler.

On television, Rawlins had recurring roles on The Defenders, Kojak, The Secret Storm, and Ryan's Hope. His feature films included Diary of a Mad Housewife and They Might Be Giants. Rawlins was a regular on the CBS soap opera, The Edge of Night for several years, where he played the role of wealthy Orin Hillyer.

He also could be heard on television and radio commercials, and was most notably the voice-over for the Dunkin' Donuts TV and radio advertising campaign created by the New York advertising agency Ally & Gargano.

Death
Rawlins died of cardiac arrest in New York City in 1988.

Filmography

References

External links

Lester Rawlins at the Lucille Lortel Archives
New York Times obituary, March 29, 1988

1924 births
1988 deaths
Male actors from Pennsylvania
American male film actors
American male stage actors
American male television actors
Drama Desk Award winners
Tony Award winners
People from Mercer County, Pennsylvania
20th-century American male actors
Carnegie Mellon University College of Fine Arts alumni